Veljko Stojnić (born 4 February 1999) is a Serbian professional road cyclist, who currently rides for UCI Continental team .

Major results

2016
 Junior National Road Championships
1st  Time trial
2nd Road race
2017
 Junior National Road Championships
1st  Road race
1st  Time trial
 2nd Overall Belgrade Trophy Milan Panić
 8th Time trial, UEC European Junior Road Championships
 9th Overall Course de la Paix Juniors
2018
 1st  Time trial, National Road Championships
 6th Time trial, Mediterranean Games
2019
 National Road Championships
2nd Road race
2nd Time trial
2020
 1st  Time trial, National Road Championships
 1st  Sprints classification, UAE Tour
 2nd Overall In the footsteps of the Romans	
2021
 1st  Mountains classification, Czech Cycling Tour
2022
 1st Stage 4 Tour de la Guadeloupe
 3rd Time trial, National Road Championships

References

External links

1999 births
Living people
Serbian male cyclists
Competitors at the 2018 Mediterranean Games
Mediterranean Games competitors for Serbia
People from Sombor
21st-century Serbian people
Competitors at the 2022 Mediterranean Games